C'est ça (English: That's It) is the fourth studio album by the Québécois band Fly Pan Am. It was released by Constellation Records in September 20, 2019. It is the band's first record after their 2018 reunion for a live show in Montreal, following a hiatus of 14 years.

The album was recorded, produced and mixed by Radwan Ghazi Moumneh at the Hotel2Tango in 2019, and mastered by Harris Newman at Grey Market Mastering.

The artwork was produced by guitarist Jonathan Parant, with graphic design and typography by Feed. The album was released digitally, in CD and in vinyl. The vinyl version comes with a poster.

Track listing 
 "Avant-gardez vous" – 1:19
 "Distance Dealer" – 4:09
 "Bleeding Decay" – 5:36
 "Dizzy Delusions" – 1:50
 "Each Ether" – 5:06
 "Alienage Syntropy" – 1:59
 "One Hit Wonder" – 6:57
 "Discreet Channeling" – 6:25
 "Interface Your Shattered Dreams" – 5:37

Personnel

Le Fly Pan Am 

 Jonathan Parant – guitars, synthesizers, electronics, vocals
 Roger Tellier-Craig – guitars, electronics, vocals
 Jean-Sébastien Truchy – bass guitar, electronics, synthesizers, mellotron, vocals
 Felix Morel – drums, scrap cymbals

Production 

 Radwan Ghazi Moumneh – production, mixing, recording
 Harris Newman – mastering

Notes

External links 
 Cstrecords.com, the official homepage of Constellation Records.

2019 albums
Constellation Records (Canada) albums
Fly Pan Am albums